The Austrian Lesbian and Gay Forum (ALGF), in German: Österreichisches Lesben- und Schwulenforum (ÖLSF), was the driving force in Austria's LGBT movement in the 1990s and has founded Austria's only Christopher Street Day (CSD) parade, called Regenbogenparade, on Vienna's Ringstrasse in 1996.

The term ALGF/ÖLSF stands for both an annual meeting of activists and an umbrella association of  important LGBT organisations in Austria. In 1999, the Austrian Lesbian and Gay Forum concluded its activity.

Annual meetings 
The ÖLSF conferences took place in seven of nine Austrian provinces and were organized mainly by local groups and associations. These meetings furthered the development of a proud and self-confident identity of Austria's LGBT community:

 1991 Linz
 1992 Innsbruck
 1993 Graz
 1994 Wien: Alpenglühen [ Glow of the Alps] with Avantgarde Festival UP-art
 1995 Linz: Donauwellen [Waves of the Danube]
 1996 Dornbirn: L(i)eben gegen den Strom [Loving and living against the stream]
 1997 St. Pölten: Lebenswelten - Menschenrechte [Living environments - Human rights]
 1998 Klagenfurt

The conferences emphasised on political and cultural discourse, but also included hedonistic workshops and events - like Tinkering dildos, Darkrooms for Lesbians, a lecture by Hermes Phettberg in a public toilet, midnight readings and dance interludes. The plenary with representatives from all over Austria always took place on the last day of the conference, it discussed in length all resolutions brought forward and voted on them. Among the most important forum papers agreed upon were the Law Resolution of 1994 and the Transgender Resolution of 1996. In 1994, the controversial proposal of a Resolution for the Abolition of Genders was not adopted.

Umbrella association 

In 1994, the plenary of the forum in Vienna decided to institutionalise the forum as association recognized by the law. The founders took some risks, due to § 221 of the Austrian Penal Code. Nevertheless, the foundation of the association took place in Graz, on February 4, 1995. Hedwig Pepelnik-Gründler and Christian Michelides were elected as presidents, Waltraud Riegler from HOSI Wien and Gernot Wartner from HOSI Linz as vice presidents.

During the following two years the new institution developed a multitude of activities and was constantly present in the public arena. In June 1995 the founders of the Forum organized the International Human Rights Tribunal against the Republic of Austria. The tribunal was chaired by environmental and human rights activist Freda Meissner-Blau and by Gerhard Oberschlick, editor of FORVM, and was dedicated to the persecution of lesbians, gays, bisexuals and transgender persons in Austria from 1945 to 1995. The Forum was the first Austrian LGBT organisation that successfully invited Austrian politicians to appear and to speak at its public events, like the Appeal to Reason at the Palais Auersperg.

In 1996 succeeded in founding Austria's first CSD parade, called Rainbow Parade, in supporting the first public blessing of a lesbian couple in an Austrian church and in staging the Dornbirn Forum - against heavy opposition of the local mayor, the catholic Vicar general and large parts of the population of Vorarlberg. Nine title pages and more than 300 letters to the editors of the local newspapers resonated the public outrage. A public reading of selected letters to the editors, held in Vienna by eight prominent personalities and organized by the ÖLSF, infuriated the local opposition even more. In late summer of 1996 the ÖLSF - due to demands from many same sex couples - installed a Blessing Hotline, that promised them to find a priest of their confession.

In late fall of 1996 two of the three discriminating paragraphs of the Austrian Penal Code were abolished,  and this success was widely seen as a result of the intense lobbying work of ÖLSF and its member organisations, like the Human chain for human rights around the parliament on October 10, 1995 during a critical meeting of a parliamentary committee. While hundreds of ÖLSF members demonstrated outside the parliament building, inside two representatives of the association answered the questions of the MPs.

At the general assembly in January 1997 the leading team was voted off, which was seen as a coup d'état by most member associations, as the individual members had the same voting powers as the associations. HOSI Wien, the most important pillar of the Forum, left the association. The assertiveness of ÖLSF expired.

Although the Forum St. Pölten again made headlines - due to the resistance of local bishop Kurt Krenn, ultra catholic publicists and the Israelite Community, the vigor of the rebels slackened. In 1999, ÖLSF was closed down.

References 

LGBT political advocacy groups in Austria
Organizations established in 1995
Counterculture
LGBT history in Austria